The 2017–18 Myanmar Women's League (also known as the KBZ Bank Myanmar Women's League for sponsorship reasons) was the 2nd season of the Myanmar Women's League, the top Myanmar professional league for women's association football clubs, since its establishment in 2016. A total of 8 teams will compete in the league.  The season began on 29 December 2017. Fixtures for the 2017–18 season were announced on 25 December 2017.

Myawady are the defending champions, having won the Myanmar Women's League title the previous season.

League table

Below is the league table for 2017–18 season.

Matches
Fixtures and Results of the 2017–18 National League 2 season.

Week 1

Week 2

Week 3

Week 4

Week 5

Week 6

Week 7

Week 8

Week 9

Week 10

Week 11

Week 12

Week 13

Week 14

Season statistics

Top scorers
As of 21 April 2018.

See also
 2018 Myanmar National League
 2018 National League 2

References

Women's football leagues in Myanmar
Myanmar